Kengerli is a village in the Sur District of Diyarbakir Province in Turkey.

References

Villages in Sur District